George Perkins Foster (October 3, 1835 – March 19, 1879) was a school teacher, Colonel and brevet brigadier general in the Union Army during the American Civil War, and then a United States Marshal.

Early life and career
Foster was born in Walden, Vermont, the son of Ephraim and Emily (Perkins) Foster. Of his early life little is known except that he was a teacher in his hometown school district.

Civil War
He was commissioned captain of Company G, 4th Vermont Infantry, on September 21, 1861, promoted major on July 18, 1862, lieutenant colonel November 5, 1862 and colonel on February 3, 1864, replacing Charles B. Stoughton, who had resigned.

According to Vermont's military historian, George Benedict, Foster was "of stalwart proportions, and handsome face and figure, he was one of the finest looking officers in the brigade. He was a favorite with his men, distinguished himself as emphatically a fighting colonel."

He was present in every action of the Vermont Brigade until he was severely wounded in the thigh on the first day of the Battle of the Wilderness, on May 5, 1864. While home recuperating from his wounds, he married Sarah Salome Hubbell (1840–1891), of Burlington, on July 5, 1864, in Wolcott, Vermont.

At the Battle at Lee's Mills, April 16, 1862, he led a company of skirmishers early in the engagement. On December 13, 1862, at the Battle of Fredericksburg, Lieutenant Colonel Foster led the 4th Vermont Infantry on the skirmish line in front of Howe's division of the VI Corps. At the battle of Winchester, Colonel Foster had command of the Vermont Brigade.

He was nominated to receive the brevet rank of brigadier general by President Abraham Lincoln on January 1, 1865, "for gallant and meritorious service before Richmond and in the Shenandoah Valley, Virginia," to date from August 1, 1864.  The Senate approved the appointment on February 14, 1865.

He mustered out of Federal service with his regiment on July 13, 1865.

Postwar career
President Ulysses S. Grant nominated Foster to be U.S. Marshal for the district of Vermont, on January 10, 1870, succeeding Hugh H. Henry, who had died in office.  He was appointed January 24, and served in that position until his death.

His tenure was highlighted "by his bold arrest of the Fenian commander, General John O'Neill, in the midst of his army, during the Fenian invasion of Canada, in 1870." He made the arrest immediately after O'Neill's defeat at the Battle of Trout River.

He died in Burlington, Vermont, and is buried in Burlington's Lakeview Cemetery.

See also

List of American Civil War brevet generals (Union)

Notes

References
 Benedict, G. G., Vermont in the Civil War. A History of the part taken by the Vermont Soldiers And Sailors in the War For The Union, 1861-5. Burlington, VT.: The Free Press Association, 1888, i:162, 163, 164, 165, 167, 168, 174, 176, 216, 414, 425, 485, 526, 545, 566, 572, 612.
 Eicher, John H., and David J. Eicher, Civil War High Commands. Stanford: Stanford University Press, 2001. .
 History of Marshals for the District of Vermont, United States Marshals Service
 Peck, Theodore S., compiler, Revised Roster of Vermont Volunteers and lists of Vermonters Who Served in the Army and Navy of the United States During the War of the Rebellion, 1861-66. Montpelier, VT.: Press of the Watchman Publishing Co., 1892, p. 751

Further reading
 Coffin, Howard, Full Duty: Vermonters in the Civil War. Woodstock, VT.: Countryman Press, 1995.
 -----. The Battered Stars: One State's Civil War Ordeal during Grant's Overland Campaign. Woodstock, VT.: Countryman Press, 2002.
 U.S. War Department, The War of the Rebellion: A Compilation of the Official Records of the Union and Confederate Armies'', 70 volumes in 4 series. Washington, D.C.: United States Government Printing Office, 1880-1901.

External links

The Fenians and the American Civil War

1835 births
1879 deaths
People of Vermont in the American Civil War
Union Army generals
United States Marshals
People of the Fenian raids
Vermont Brigade
People from Caledonia County, Vermont
Burials at Lakeview Cemetery (Burlington, Vermont)